Lek Yuen is one of the 36 constituencies in the Sha Tin District of Hong Kong.

The constituency returns one district councillor to the Sha Tin District Council, with an election every four years. The seat was last held by Jimmy Sham of the League of Social Democrats.

Lek Yuen constituency is loosely based on Lek Yuen Estate with an estimated population of 15,959.

Councillors represented

Election results

2010s

2000s

1990s

Notes

References

Sha Tin
Constituencies of Hong Kong
Constituencies of Sha Tin District Council
1994 establishments in Hong Kong
Constituencies established in 1994